RTVi+ was a Canadian category 2 Russian language digital cable specialty channel and is owned by Ethnic Channels Group.  It broadcast Russian movies, TV dramas, cartoons as well as local Canadian content.

History

TV Center
On November 9, 2004, the Ethnic Channels Group (ECG) launched an ethnic Category 2 Specialty television service under the licence Russian TV Two issued by the Canadian Radio-television and Telecommunications Commission (CRTC). The channel was branded as TV Center and initially broadcast programming of a Russian satellite TV service known as Moscow – Open World (Москва — Открытый мир). That time, Moscow - Open World held the exclusive rights to bring the programming of Russian terrestrial TV network TV Center (ТВ Центр) outside Russia. However, due to a conflict between the partners, in summer 2005, TV Center launched its own international version of the channel, TVCI (TV Center International), intended for Russian Diasporas around the world. As a result, Moscow - Open World became defunct and ECG switched the channel programming to TVCI.

RTVi+

In Fall 2005, ECG re-branded the channel to be known as RTVi+ and switched its programming to the 'world feed' of RTVI In November, 2009, all television providers who carried the channel had dropped it without comment.

Digital cable television networks in Canada
Multicultural and ethnic television in Canada
Television channels and stations established in 2004
Russian-Canadian culture
Russian-language television stations
Television channels and stations disestablished in 2009
RTVI